Maud Casey is an American novelist, and professor of creative writing at University of Maryland, College Park.

Life
She is the daughter of novelist John Casey.
She graduated from University of Arizona with an M.F.A.

She won a Guggenheim Fellowship.

Award and honors
2015 St. Francis College Literary Prize, The Man Who Walked Away

Bibliography
The Shape of Things to Come (2001, HarperCollins)
Genealogy: A Novel (2006, HarperCollins)
Drastic (2008, HarperCollins)
The Man Who Walked Away: A Novel (2014, Bloomsbury Publishing)

References

External links

Living people
21st-century American novelists
Year of birth missing (living people)
Place of birth missing (living people)
University of Arizona alumni
University of Maryland, College Park faculty
St. Francis College Literary Prize
Novelists from Maryland